Kerala Cafe is a 2009 Indian Malayalam-language anthology film produced by Ranjith and directed by a team of ten directors including Lal Jose, Shaji Kailas, Anwar Rasheed, Shyamaprasad, B. Unnikrishnan, Revathy, Anjali Menon, M. Padmakumar, Shankar Ramakrishnan, and Uday Ananthan. For the first time in Malayalam cinema, one film was conceived by a team of ten directors. Ten cinematographers, musicians, editors, art directors and almost all the top Malayalam film actors joined this unique venture. The ensemble cast includes Mammootty, Suresh Gopi, Dileep, Prithviraj Sukumaran, Rahman, Fahadh Faasil, Jayasurya, Suraj Venjarammood, Navya Nair, Nithya Menen, and others.

Backwater Media & Entertainment Private Limited distributed the film. The film released in Kerala on 29 October 2009.

Theme
On a common theme of journeys, each filmmaker presents their cinematic impression of contemporary times in Kerala. The independent narratives integrate when, during these journeys, their characters pass through Kerala Cafe—a quaint railway cafeteria—thereby creating a joint mosaic of issues and impressions.

The project involved ten different cinematographers from the industry. The project features ten different stories from different settings in Kerala, providing ample scope for a diverse bouquet of visual styles. The intersection of the ten stories happens in a railway cafeteria called "Kerala Café", where there is an interaction among the characters of the different stories. This portion was collectively shot by the participating directors and the cinematography was done by Prakash Kutty. Ranjith was the compiler and the producer of the project.

Songs

The only song featured in the movie is "Kathayamama, Kathayamama, Kathakalathisadaram", an ode to Thunchath Ezhuthachan's famous verse, shown when the final credits roll. The lyrics of the song are by Rafeeq Ahamed and the music was created by Bijibal, with the voice of P. Jayachandran.

List of short films

Plots

Nostalgia (First segment)
Nostalgia that is loosely based on Venugopal's poem Naatuvazhikal is the first film that unfolds.
Johnykutty (Dileep) is employed in the Middle East, who claims to friends to long to return to Kerala some day. On a vacation back to India though, he despises the government and the potholes on the road, the bureaucracy and the people. Having signed a deal to sell off his ancestral mansion, enrolling his kids in a boarding school, and making fake promises to his old friend (Sudheesh), he flies back to Dubai, to commence his nostalgic laments all over again.

Island Express (Second segment)
The hero (Prithviraj) zooms down and starts whispering to us about Jesus, Frankenstein and Mangalassery Neelakantan, the idol trio who have had a say in his life.
With his 'editor-publisher'(Kani) hanging around his arms, the writer that he is, speeds off to Kerala, promising her that he would get traditional attire to cover her up when they reach there.
An aged woman (Sukumari) waits around for her bus to arrive in some bus station, while an army officer (Jayasurya) sitting nearby dozes off, his head resting gently on her shoulders.
A dishevelled looking man in his fifties (Maniyanpilla Raju), brushes aside the advances of a teenage girl in a shabby looking lodge, as he gets all ready to go somewhere.
Island Express splendidly bonds together these diverse characters and more in a dramatic climax.

Lalitham Hiranmayam (Third segment)
Ramesh (Suresh Gopi) is caught between his wife Lalitha (Jyothirmayi) and mistress Mayi (Dhanya Mary Varghese) and has to take the big decision now.
The turmoil that goes on inside the man's mind is slickly edited and trendily depicted on screen.
Ramesh discloses his affair with Mayi to Lalitha before his accidental death, and Lalitha accepts Mayi and her child as part of her life.

Mrityunjayam (Fourth segment)
Mrityunjayam has a journalist (Fahadh Faasil) doing an investigative story on a spooky old 'Mana' (ancestral Kerala house) that in its owner's (Thilakan) own words is a 'very different and peculiar place'.
He falls in love with a girl, the owner's grand daughter (Rima Kallingal) who greets him at the door there, and pops the question if he could marry her. She is taken aback but all the more impressed by his candidness. He then proceeds to the "Mana" to unveil the mystery despite its owner's cautionary warning, and returns to visit the girl again. In the end the journalist also succumbs to the mystery of the "Mana", and is found dead inside, the next morning. It is revealed that it was his ghost that came to visit the girl that night.

Happy Journey (Fifth segment)
A middle aged man (Jagathy Sreekumar) delights himself with a bit of flirting with a young girl (Nithya Menen) sitting beside him on a bus from Ernakulam to Kozhikode. Edging his way into the girl's seat and engaging in worthless conversation, he is all optimistic about the night that lies ahead. The girl on the other hand is initially uncomfortable, but all of a sudden composedly takes on a different garb that stuns the man. Against all odds, she would keep her head above the water, and a calmness descends on her that is at once creepy and confident.
A psychological combat between the two ensues that concludes in an impressive climax.

Aviramam (Sixth segment)
Aviramam talks of life that would go on, even as one strives to put an end to it all.
Devi (Shwetha Menon) wakes up to find her doting husband Ravi (Siddique) beside her with a cup of tea. Gulping down the tea, she talks of 'how horrible a kisser' he was.
There is talk of the recession eating into the IT sector and Ravi's business in particular before they get ready to leave for the railway station with their kids. Having seen off his family on a short vacation of three days, Ravi heads back home and gets a noose ready to finally call it a day. But the true love of Devi prevents any mishaps and they decide to take on life as it comes.

Off Season (Seventh segment)
Kunjappai (Suraj Venjarammood) gets all pepped up as he comes across a foreigner couple on an almost empty Kovalam beach. His hopes of earning some quick money are dashed when he learns that they are broke and have actually traveled all the way from Lisbon looking for work in India. But Kunjappai and the couple bond well, and soon all's well that ends well

Bridge (Eighth segment)
Bridge illustrates the very obvious symbols of loss, misery and desolation.
The film talks about two parallel tracks, the first one involving a young boy and his pet kitten. The father discards the pet kitten to discipline the child, but the child falls ill, and the father then sets out to find the kitten to calm his son, but to no avail.
The other story has a son (Salim Kumar), who lives in poor surroundings, deciding to leave his ailing mother (Kozhikkode Shantha Devi) in the street.
In the end, it is shown that the old lady and the kitten have found each other, and both are sitting on the verandah of Kerala cafe.

Makal (Ninth segment)
Makal is about the flesh trade which is happening under the guise of adoption.
Sona Nair and Sreenath have done the main roles.

Puram Kazhchakal (Tenth segment)
Puram Kazhchakal portrays a nameless man (Mammootty) aboard a bus trudging along a hill terrain.
His anger and impatience at the slow moving vehicle is being amusedly watched by a fellow passenger (Sreenivasan) who gulps down his own memories.

Release
The film was premiered in Abu Dhabi on 9 October 2009. The film released in theatres on 29 October 2009.

Reception
Critics gave the movie generally favourable reviews. Giving it four stars out of five, Nowrunning.com commented: "Open up this box of assorted candies, and you see them all laid out on a salver, quite uneven in manner and matter, posture and perspective and yet it all builds into something quite incredible that makes this ambitious enterprise a fascinating filmic feast."
Movie Buzz of Sify.com said, "Here is a film that looks different from the rest and catches the viewers' attention quite easily."

References

External links

Stills. Indiaglitz.com.
First Look: Kerala Cafe. rediff.com

2009 films
2000s Malayalam-language films
Films scored by Rex Vijayan
Films scored by Ouseppachan
Films scored by Isaac Thomas
Films scored by M. Jayachandran
Films scored by Rahul Raj
Films scored by Bijibal
Indian anthology films
Indian avant-garde and experimental films
2000s avant-garde and experimental films
Films directed by Anjali Menon
Films directed by Revathi